Twenty Years (Italian: Vent'anni) is a 1949 Italian comedy film directed by Giorgio Bianchi and starring Oscar Blando, Francesco Golisano and Liliana Mancini. It was part of the Italian neorealism movement of postwar Italy.

Plot
Two petty thieves plan a much bigger scam than they usually practice, but complications ensue.

Cast
 Oscar Blando as Ciro
 Francesco Golisano as Geppa
 Liliana Mancini as Iris
 Marcella Melnati as Nonna
 Titti Brandani
 Nando Bruno
 Vittoria Crispo
 Checco Durante
 Barbara Leite
 Lamberto Maggiorani
 Marcello Mastroianni
 Lolly Moreno
 Marcella Ruffini

References

Bibliography
 Enrico Lancia. Dizionario del cinema italiano: Gli atori, Volume I. Gremese Editore, 2003.

External links

Twenty Years at Variety Distribution

1949 films
Italian comedy films
1940s Italian-language films
1949 comedy films
Italian black-and-white films
Films directed by Giorgio Bianchi
Films with screenplays by Cesare Zavattini
1940s Italian films